Husam Said Zomlot (born 1973) is a Palestinian diplomat, academic and economist. He was appointed Head of the Palestinian Mission to the United Kingdom in October 2018. Before his posting to the UK, he served as head of the PLO mission to the United States that was closed by President Donald Trump's administration.

Zomlot is a senior member of Fatah, the main Palestinian political movement, and a strategic advisor to Palestinian President Mahmoud Abbas. He previously served as director of Fatah's commission for foreign relations.

Before entering politics, Zomlot was a professor of Public policy at Birzeit University. He was a post-doctoral fellow at Harvard University in the US and an instructor at the University of London. He also worked as an economist with United Nations Special Coordinator's Office in Palestine.

Early life
Zomlot was born in Shaburah refugee camp, a United Nations Relief and Works Agency camp in Rafah in the occupied Gaza Strip in 1973. His parents were originally from the village of Simsim but left in the 1948 Palestinian exodus. "In 1948, my father lost his home and his land and as a result I was born in a Rafah refugee camp," Zomlot told a conference on the occasion of the 70th anniversary of the United Nations Work and Refugee Agency, (UNRWA). "Millions [of refugees] suffer the most precarious existence of them all. Nothing is more hurtful to a human being than forced exile."

Zomlot became politically active while taking his undergraduate degree at Birzeit University outside Ramallah in the occupied West Bank. There he became a representative of Fatah’s student movement at the university during the First Intifada.

In 1999, while studying in London he was elected as president of the General Union of Palestinian Students in the UK.

Academic career
Zomlot was educated at Birzeit University in Ramallah. After receiving his undergraduate degree he worked as an economist with the Office of the United Nations Special Coordinator for the Middle East Peace Process, UNSCO. He was there tasked with monitoring economic developments, propose economic policy alternatives and provide briefings to the United Nations General Secretary, Kofi Annan at that time.

In 2000, he completed a master's degree in development studies at the London School of Economics (LSE). He received his PhD in International Political Economy from the School of Oriental and African Studies (SOAS) of the University of London in 2007.

Before joining Birzeit as professor of public policy in 2012 he was Scholar in Residence at Harvard's Belfer Center for Science and International Affairs, John F. Kennedy School of Government (2008–2010).

Political career
Zomlot served as a spokesperson for the Palestinian delegation during the statehood campaign at the United Nations in New York in 2011.

He was appointed ambassador-at-large for the State of Palestine that same year, and also served as director of Fatah's commission for foreign relations.

He became strategic advisor to President of the State of Palestine Mahmoud Abbas in 2015 before being elected to Fatah's Revolutionary Council in 2016.

In 2017, Zomlot was appointed as envoy to the United States, taking over from Maen Rashid Areikat.

His tenure there was cut short after the Trump administration decided to close the PLO mission in Washington DC and subsequently recognise Jerusalem as Israel's capital. In December 2017, the White House announced its intention to move the US embassy to Israel to the city from Tel Aviv. The Palestinian leadership countered by boycotting ties with the US administration.

In 2018, Zomlot was appointed Head of Mission to the United Kingdom.

Palestinian Ambassador to the United States
Zomlot was appointed Palestinian envoy to the US in March 2017. There followed a period of intense bilateral contacts, when Palestinian President Mahmoud Abbas and US President Donald Trump met four times in the period between May and September 2017.

But efforts came to a halt when the White House in November 2017 informed Zomlot of its intention to close the PLO mission in Washington DC and in December announced its recognition of Jerusalem as the capital of Israel and plans to move the US embassy in Israel from Tel-Aviv to Jerusalem. The move undermines a significant Palestinian policy that the eastern part of the city, occupied by Israel in 1967, should eventually serve as the capital of Palestine.

The announcement sparked protests in the occupied Palestinian areas. and led the Palestinian leadership to reject US mediation.

Said Zomlot at the time: "You didn’t take Jerusalem off the table. You took the table altogether. No one, no Palestinian, would ever be able to sit on that table. Good luck!"

In September 2018, the PLO's representative mission in Washington, D.C., was closed but by then Zomlot had already been recalled to Ramallah. As a result, what would eventually become the Trump Peace to Prosperity plan for peace between Israelis and Palestinians was developed only with input from Benjamin Netanyahu's Israeli government.

Zomlot nevertheless argued that a recalibration of Palestinian-US relations could have three positive outcomes: "it frees the Palestinians from the shackles of a failed 27-year-old, American-led peace process… it provides an opportunity to repeal a 1987 law designating the Palestine Liberation Organization as a terrorist organization… [it] will help redirect Palestinian attention [to] long-term engagement directly with the American people".

Palestinian Ambassador to the United Kingdom 
Zomlot was appointed Head of Mission to the United Kingdom in October 2018. He arrived in the middle of Britain's process of leaving the EU and in his first year-and-a-half experienced two different Conservative governments and two different opposition leaders.

Since his appointment, bilateral Palestinian-British relations have deepened. In spite of US administration moves to defund both the Palestinian Authority and UNRWA, British aid to both has continued (and doubled in the case of UNRWA) while the British government continues to support a two-state solution to the Palestinian-Israeli conflict as mandated by international law.

As ambassador, he criticised the Israeli government during the 2021 Israel–Palestine crisis.

Other work/controversy
Zomlot is cofounder of the Palestinian Strategy Group, which was established in 2008. A Palestinian think-tank, the PSG comprises more than 100 members selected from a wide range of crucial Palestinians from different political, professional, and geographic backgrounds.

In 2018, just before taking up his post in London, Zomlot was forced to defend himself against accusations that he was a Holocaust denier. British tabloid newspapers made the allegation in stories about then UK opposition leader Jeremy Corbyn's attendance at Zomlot's wedding.

"I do not deny the Holocaust, which was a heinous crime," Zomlot told an Israeli newspaper. "I know very well what happened to European Jews. I have sat next to the family members of survivors and listened to the horrifying details of what their loved ones experienced."

Zomlot has been accused of corruption several times. Since his arrival to the UK, Zomlot appointed several of his relatives to the Palestinian delegation and was accused of money embezzlement, besides creating controversy over limiting the role of the General Union of Palestinian Students (GUPS) in the UK by controlling their funds and using them for personal purposes.

A picture was posted on GUPS's official page showing Zomlot's bodyguard attacking a Palestinian student and a member of the GUPS in the Palestinian delegation office in the UK due to overheated conversation on accusations of Zomlot's corruption.
In 2021 when the Palestinian elections were announced and before the PA canceled them, a page was created on Facebook: "Support Zomlot for Palestine presidency." Later on, Zomlot denied that the page was his.

Zomlot is seen as a hero by the PA but viewed among Palestinian street and Pro-Palestine activists with unpopularity and lack of support due to the corruption of the PA. This draws attention to the thoughts of the Palestinian street on PA's role in cooperating with Israel and using the Palestinian cause for selfish benefit.

Personal life 
Zomlot is married to Suzan, a biomedical scientist, with whom he has three children.

References



Ambassadors of the State of Palestine to the United Kingdom
1973 births
Living people
People from Rafah Governorate
Fatah members
Birzeit University alumni
Palestinian diplomats
Alumni of the London School of Economics
Ambassadors of the State of Palestine to the United States
Academics of the London School of Economics
Harvard Kennedy School faculty
Palestinian economists